Ook Chung, born in Japan in 1963, is a Québécois writer. Chung was born to Korean parents in Japan and immigrated to Canada at the age of 2.  He studied French literature at McGill and Concordia universities before obtaining his doctorate at McGill.

Awards 
 2002: John Glassco Prize (translation into French of Kerri Sakamoto's The Electrical Field)
 2002: Prix littéraire Canada-Japon (Kimchi)
 2000: Prix littéraire Canada-Japon (Proposed but never realized Testament de Tokyo)

Works 
 
 1994: Nouvelles orientales et désorientées, Montreal, L'Hexagone.
 2001: Le Clézio, une écriture prophétique, Paris, Imago.
 2001: Kimchi, Paris, Le Serpent à plumes.
 2003: L'Expérience interdite, Montreal, Boréal.
 2003: Contes Butô, Montreal, Boréal.
 2012: La Trilogie coréenne, Montreal, Boréal.
 2021: La jeune fille de la paix, Montreal.

References

Living people
1963 births
Writers from Quebec
Canadian short story writers in French
Canadian people of Korean descent
Canadian writers of Asian descent
Canadian translators